Wendell Hudson (born April 16, 1951) is a retired American basketball player and former Associate Athletics Director for Alumni Relations and the former women's basketball program head coach of Alabama Crimson Tide women's basketball. In 1969, Hudson signed for Alabama coach C.M. Newton and thus became the first African-American scholarship athlete in any sport at the University of Alabama. On April 22, 2013, Hudson resigned after he served five seasons as head coach of the Alabama women's basketball team. He now serves in an administrative role in the athletic department.

On February 17, 2020, Hudson's number 20 jersey was retired by the Alabama men's basketball team, becoming the first player to have their jersey number retired by the program.

Head coaching record

References

External links 
 Bio for Wendell Hudson
 Alabama Sports Hall of Fame

1951 births
Living people
African-American basketball coaches
African-American basketball players
Alabama Crimson Tide men's basketball coaches
Alabama Crimson Tide men's basketball players
Alabama Crimson Tide women's basketball coaches
American men's basketball players
American women's basketball coaches
Basketball coaches from Alabama
Basketball players from Birmingham, Alabama
Baylor Bears men's basketball coaches
Chicago Bulls draft picks
Forwards (basketball)
Junior college men's basketball coaches in the United States
Junior college women's basketball coaches in the United States
Ole Miss Rebels men's basketball coaches
Rice Owls men's basketball coaches
Sportspeople from Birmingham, Alabama
21st-century African-American people
20th-century African-American sportspeople